Lipandra polysperma (Syn. Chenopodium polyspermum), common name manyseed goosefoot, is the only species of the monotypic plant genus Lipandra from the subfamily Chenopodioideae of the family Amaranthaceae.

Description 
Lipandra polysperma is a non-aromatic, glabrous annual herb. The stems grow erect to ascending or prostrate and are branched with usually alternate, basally sometimes nearly opposite branches. The alternate leaves consist of a petiole and a simple blade. The leaf blade is thin, ovate-elliptic, with entire margins.

The inflorescences consist of loose dichasia in the axils of leaf-like bracts, sometimes of more condensed glomerules of flowers arranged spicately. The flowers are bisexual or pistillate, with (4-) 5 nearly free perianth segments,
1-3 (-5) stamens and an ovary with 2 stigmas.

In fruit, perianth segments remain unchanged. The fruit has a membranous pericarp, which is free from the seed. The horizontally orientated seeds are compressed-globose. The brown to blackish seed coat is undulately striate.

Distribution 
Lipandra polysperma is distributed in most regions of Europe and in temperate Asia. It is widely naturalized elsewhere, as in North America.

Systematics 
The species was first described in 1753 by Carl Linnaeus as Chenopodium polyspermum in Species Plantarum. After phylogenetic research, Fuentes-Bazan et al. (2012) separated this species from genus Chenopodium that would otherwise have been polyphyletic. The genus Lipandra was first described by Alfred Moquin-Tandon in 1840 (in Chenopodearum monographica enumeratio, p. 19.), replacing an older illegitimate name: Christian Friedrich Lessing's genus Oligandra (1835, not the Asteraceae genus Oligandra from 1832) had only one species, Oligandra atriplicoides, that was soon considered identical with Chenopodium polyspermum.

Lipandra polysperma belongs to the same tribe as Chenopodium, Tribus Atripliceae.

Synonyms of genus Lipandra Moq.:
Oligandra Less. 1835 (nom illeg., non Less. 1832)
Gandriloa Steud. (nom. illeg.)
Oliganthera Endl. (nom. illeg.)
Chenopodium [unranked] Polysperma Standl.
Chenopodium subsect. Polysperma (Standl.) Kowal ex Mosyakin & Clemants

References

External links 

 Chenopodium polyspermum in Flora of North America

Chenopodioideae
Amaranthaceae genera
Monotypic Caryophyllales genera